The Olympus E-30 is a Four Thirds System camera produced between December 2008 and about 2011.  It was the only two-digit model in the E DSLR series, positioned between the Olympus E-520 and the  E-3 cameras in terms of size, weight, capabilities and price.  It was sold in a kit with the Olympus Zuiko Digital 14-54mm f/2.8-3.5 II lens.

References

E-30
Four Thirds System